Captive Flock (translit. Pleneno yato) is a 1962 Bulgarian drama film directed by Ducho Mundrov. It was entered into the 1962 Cannes Film Festival.

Cast
 Dimitar Buynozov - Boris
 Stefan Ilyev - Vladimir
 Asen Kisimov - Petar
 Kiril Kovachev - Hristo
 Peter Slabakov - Anton
 Atanas Velikov - Vasil
 Lili Raynova
 Nadezhda Vakavchieva
 Bozhidar Dyakov
 Magda Kolchakova
 Simeon Yotov
 Kina Dasheva
 Mitko Videnov
 Rositza Slavcheva

References

External links

1962 films
1960s Bulgarian-language films
1962 drama films
Bulgarian black-and-white films
Bulgarian drama films